8000 (eight thousand) is the natural number following 7999 and preceding 8001.

8000 is the cube of 20, as well as the sum of four consecutive integers cubed, 113 + 123 + 133 + 143.

The fourteen tallest mountains on Earth, which exceed 8000 meters in height, are sometimes referred to as eight-thousanders.

Selected numbers in the range 8001–8999

8001 to 8099
 8001 – triangular number
 8002 – Mertens function zero
 8011 – Mertens function zero, super-prime
 8012 – Mertens function zero
 8017 – Mertens function zero
 8021 – Mertens function zero
 8039 – safe prime
 8059 – super-prime
 8069 – Sophie Germain prime
 8093 – Sophie Germain prime

8100 to 8199
 8100 = 902
 8101 – super-prime
 8111 – Sophie Germain prime
 8117 – super-prime, balanced prime
 8119 – octahedral number; 8119/5741 ≈ √2
 8125 – pentagonal pyramidal number
 8128 – perfect number, harmonic divisor number, 127th triangular number, 64th hexagonal number, eighth 292-gonal number, fourth 1356-gonal number
 8147 – safe prime
 8189 – highly cototient number
 8190 – harmonic divisor number
 8191 – Mersenne prime
 8192 = 213

8200 to 8299
 8208 – base 10 narcissistic number as 84 + 24 + 04 + 84 = 8208
 8219 – twin prime with 8221
 8221 – super-prime, twin prime with 8219
 8233 – super-prime, centered heptagonal number
 8243 – Sophie Germain prime
 8256 – triangular number
 8257 – sum of the squares of the first fourteen primes
 8269 – cuban prime of the form x = y + 1
 8273 – Sophie Germain prime
 8281 = 912, sum of the cubes of the first thirteen integers, nonagonal number, centered octagonal number
 8287 – super-prime

8300 to 8399
 8321 – super-Poulet number
 8326 – decagonal number
 8361 – Leyland number
 8377 – super-prime
 8385 – triangular number
 8389 – super-prime, twin prime

8400 to 8499
 8423 – safe prime
 8436 – tetrahedral number
 8464 = 922

8500 to 8599
 8513 – Sophie Germain prime, super-prime
 8515 – triangular number
 8521 – sexy prime with 8527
 8527 – super-prime, sexy prime with 8521
 8543 – safe prime
 8555 – square pyramidal number
 8558 – Large Schröder number
 8576 – centered heptagonal number
 8581 – super-prime

8600 to 8699
 8625 – nonagonal number
 8646 – triangular number
 8649 = 932, centered octagonal number
 8658 - sum of the first four perfect numbers (6, 28, 496, 8128) and the product of the culturally significant 666 and 13
 8663 – Sophie Germain prime
 8693 – Sophie Germain prime
 8695 – decagonal number
 8699 – safe prime

8700 to 8799
 8712 – smallest number that is divisible by its reverse: 8712 = 4 × 2178 (excluding palindromes and numbers with trailing zeros)
 8713 – balanced prime
 8719 – super-prime
 8741 – Sophie Germain prime
 8747 – safe prime, balanced prime, super-prime
 8748 – 3-smooth number (22×37)
 8751 – perfect totient number
 8760 - the number of hours in a non-leap year; 365 × 24
 8761 – super-prime
 8778 – triangular number
 8783 – safe prime
 8784 - the number of hours in a leap year; 366 × 24

8800 to 8899
 8801 – magic constant of n × n normal magic square and n-Queens Problem for n = 26.
 8807 – super-prime, sum of eleven consecutive primes (761 + 769 + 773 + 787 + 797 + 809 + 811 + 821 + 823 + 827 + 829)
 8819 – safe prime
 8833 = 882 + 332
 8836 = 942
 8839 – sum of twenty-three consecutive primes (313 + 317 + 331 + 337 + 347 + 349 + 353 + 359 + 367 + 373 + 379 + 383 + 389 + 397 + 401 + 409 + 419 + 421 + 431 + 433 + 439 + 443 + 449)
 8849 – super-prime
 8855 – member of a Ruth-Aaron pair (first definition) with 8856
 8856 – member of a Ruth-Aaron pair (first definition) with 8855
 8888 - repdigit

8900 to 8999
 8911 – Carmichael number, triangular number
 8923 – super-prime
 8926 – centered heptagonal number
 8933 – the 1,111th prime number
 8944 – sum of the cubes of the first seven primes
 8951 – Sophie Germain prime
 8963 – safe prime
 8964 – number referring to the 1989 Tiananmen Square Protests
 8969 – Sophie Germain prime
 8976 – enneagonal number
 8999 – super-prime

Prime numbers
There are 110 prime numbers between 8000 and 9000:
8009, 8011, 8017, 8039, 8053, 8059, 8069, 8081, 8087, 8089, 8093, 8101, 8111, 8117, 8123, 8147, 8161, 8167, 8171, 8179, 8191, 8209, 8219, 8221, 8231, 8233, 8237, 8243, 8263, 8269, 8273, 8287, 8291, 8293, 8297, 8311, 8317, 8329, 8353, 8363, 8369, 8377, 8387, 8389, 8419, 8423, 8429, 8431, 8443, 8447, 8461, 8467, 8501, 8513, 8521, 8527, 8537, 8539, 8543, 8563, 8573, 8581, 8597, 8599, 8609, 8623, 8627, 8629, 8641, 8647, 8663, 8669, 8677, 8681, 8689, 8693, 8699, 8707, 8713, 8719, 8731, 8737, 8741, 8747, 8753, 8761, 8779, 8783, 8803, 8807, 8819, 8821, 8831, 8837, 8839, 8849, 8861, 8863, 8867, 8887, 8893, 8923, 8929, 8933, 8941, 8951, 8963, 8969, 8971, 8999

References

Integers